The Jagua Formation is a Late Jurassic (middle to late Oxfordian) geologic formation in the Sierra de los Órganos and Sierra del Rosario mountain ranges in Pinar del Río Province, western Cuba. Plesiosaur, pliosaur, pterosaur, metriorhynchid, turtle and dinosaur remains are among the fossils that have been recovered from its strata.

Description 
The formation comprises marine shales and limestones. The latter contains calcareous concretions which the fossils are found in. The formation overlies the San Cayetano Formation and is overlain by the Guasasa Formation. The bedding direction is steeply dipping towards the northwest.

Fossil content

Vertebrate paleofauna

Other fossils 

Favreina
Globochaete
 Gryphaea mexicana - Pan de Azúcar Mb.
 Lepidotes gloriae
 Liostrea mairei
 L. sandalina - Zacarías Mb.
 Nanogyra (Nanogyra) nana - Zacarías Mb.
 Ostrea broughtoni - Zacarías Mb.
 Plicatula cf. weymouthiana - Zacarías Mb.
 Voltzia palmeri
 Perisphinctes sp.

See also 
 Plesiosaur stratigraphic distribution
 List of pterosaur-bearing stratigraphic units

References

Bibliography

Further reading 
 
 
 
 
 
 

Geologic formations of Cuba
Jurassic Cuba
Oxfordian Stage
Fossiliferous stratigraphic units of North America
Paleontology in Cuba
Shale formations
Limestone formations
Shallow marine deposits
Formations